The following is a timeline of the history of the city of Alicante, Spain.

Prior to 20th century

 718 - Moors in power.
 1240 - Valencian moor Zayyan ibn Mardanix became governor (rais) of Laqant, until he departed to exile in 1247.
 1247 - Castle of Alacant is defended by Valencian moor al-Azraq.
 1252 - Owned by Alfonso X.
 1265 - Colonized mainly by Catalan population during an ongoing military campaign led by James I of Aragon. Catalan became traditional language in Alicante since then until nowadays.
 1296/1304 - Alicante becomes part of the Kingdom of Valencia per Treaty of Torrellas.
 1331 - Attempted siege of Alicante by Moorish forces.
 1490 - Given the status of a town by Ferdinand II.
 1662 - San Nicolás de Bari church built.
 1709 - Siege of Alicante by French forces.
 1780 -  built (approximate date).
 1785 - Consulado (merchant guild) established.
 1797 - Population: 20,000.
 1822 -  (governing body) established.
 1834 - Alicante Sociedad Económica de los Amigos del País established.
 1842 - Population: 19,021.
 1847 -  (theatre) built.
 1855 - Public library established.
 1858 -  begins operating.
 1860 -  dismantling begins.
 1873 -  by Federalists of Cartagena.
 1885 - Murcia-Alicante railway built.
 1886 -  (park) created.
 1888 -  (bullring) built.
 1900
  (courthouse) built.
 Population: 50,142.

20th century

 1906 -  newspaper begins publication.
 1913 -  newspaper begins publication.
 1919 -  (football club) formed.
 1922 - Hércules CF (football club) active.
 1924 - Cine Monumental (cinema) built.
 1925
  (cemetery) established.
  barrio developed.
 1930
 Population: 73,071.
 1931
 12 April: Municipal election held.(es)
  built.
 1932 - Archaeological Museum of Alicante opens.
 1938 - 25 May: Bombing of Alicante during the Spanish Civil War.
 1939
  (detention camp) created.
 30 March: Italian forces take city from the Republicans.
 1941 -  newspaper begins publication.
 1947 -  constructed.
 1950 - Population: 104,222.
 1956 -  built.
 1959 - Roman Catholic Diocese of Orihuela-Alicante active.
 1962 - Estudiotel Alicante high-rise built.
 1963 - El Barco high-rise built in  barrio.
 1967 - El Altet Airport opens.
 1968 - Alicante railway station rebuilt.
 1974
  (archives) established.
 Estadio José Rico Pérez (stadium) opens.
 1977 - Alicante Museum of Contemporary Art opens.
 1979
 University of Alicante established.
  (stadium) opens.
 1981 - Population: 251,387.
 1982 - Part of 1982 FIFA World Cup football contest held in Alicante.
 1983 - Biblioteca Pública Azorín de Alicante (library) active.
 1985 -  begins.
 1993 -  (theatre festival) begins.
 1999 - Alicante Tram begins operating.

21st century

 2001
 European Union Intellectual Property Office headquartered in Alicante.
 Gravina Museum of Fine Arts established.
 2004 -  begins.
 2005 - Film studio Ciudad de la Luz begins operating.
 2009 - Alicante Innovation and Territory regional development plan published.
 2011
  (concert hall) built.
 Population: 329,325.
 2014 - Population: 332,067 city; 757,085 .
 2015 -  becomes mayor.

See also
 History of Alicante
 List of mayors of Alicante

Other cities in the autonomous Valencian Community:(es)
 Timeline of Valencia

References

This article incorporates information from the Spanish Wikipedia and Catalan Wikipedia.

Bibliography

in English

in Spanish
 
 
 
 
 
 
  (4 parts)

External links

  (city archives)
 
 Items related to Alicante, various dates (via Europeana)
 Items related to Alicante, various dates (via Digital Public Library of America)

Alicante
Alicante